The TCL 10 Pro is an Android-based smartphone manufactured by TCL. It was announced on 6 April 2020. It is available in two colors: Forest Mist Green and Ember Gray.

Specifications

Hardware
TCL 10 Pro is powered by Qualcomm Snapdragon 675 system-on-chip with Adreno 612 GPU. It is equipped with accelerometer, gyroscope, IR sensor, proximity sensor and RGB light sensors.

Memory and storage 
TCL 10 Pro has 6 GB of RAM and 128 GB of internal storage. It has a dedicated microSD card slot which supports up to 256 GB of additional storage.

Display 
TCL 10 Pro has a 6.47 inch AMOLED capacitive display with 1080 x 2340 pixels (FHD+) resolution, 398 ppi (pixels per inch) pixel density and 93% screen to body ratio.

Camera 
TCL 10 Pro has dual LED flash and a four camera setup at the back with a 64-megapixel main camera with f/1.89 aperture; a 16-megapixel wide-angle camera with f/2.4 aperture; a 5-megapixel macro camera with f/2.2 aperture and a 2-megapixel depth sensor with f/1.8 aperture. It has contrast detection autofocus, laser detection autofocus and phase-detection autofocus with 10X hybrid digital zoom. The front facing camera is a 24-megapixel sensor with f/2.0 aperture.

Battery 
TCL 10 Pro features a non-removable 4500 mAh Li-Po battery. It has Quick Charge 3.0 18W (9V/2A) fast charging, it can charge 50% in 35 minutes.

Software
TCL 10 Pro runs on Android 10 mobile operating system and TCL UI user interface.

References

Android (operating system) devices
Mobile phones introduced in 2020
Mobile phones with multiple rear cameras
Mobile phones with infrared transmitter